Claudia Serpieri is a world record-holding Italian technical diver and instructor, with Finnish mather. She was co-founder with Stefano Di Cagno of the team BioHazard, the extreme dive team of DDR Org. Deep Diving Research Organization, which has partnerships with space agencies, hyperbaric researchers, universities and the Navy (see Nave Proteo), and chief editor of Captain Nemo magazine for five year. She was the first using a closed circuit rebreather in a deep dive, in the 2002, with 105 m./344,5 ft. in the lake of Bracciano, Italy. She is actually a PADI Staff Instructor, PTA Instructor Trainer, and lives and works in Sharm El Sheikh, Egypt at MHM Blue World Diving Center.

World records

She holds a number of world records:
 women's deepest dive on open circuit,
 women's deepest altitude dive in lake,
 women's deepest wreck dive.

She also holds the Italian women’s record for deepest dive in a sinkhole and in a cave, and leads the exploration team at the sinkhole Merro in Italy.

Bibliography
 Stefano Di Cagno, Morire quassotto sarebbe darvi una soddisfazione, Captain Nemo Edizioni, 2004
 Stefano Di Cagno, Incubi Decompressivi, Captain Nemo Edizioni, 2006
 Fabio Perozzi, Aria Profonda, Magenes Edizioni, 2010
 Francesco S. D'Aquino, Luca Lucarini, Fabio Perozzi, Blu Estremo, Magenes Edizioni, 2012
 Stefano Di Cagno, Fantasmi d'acqua, Captain Nemo Edizioni, 2013
 Stefano Di Cagno, Laura Vernotico, Subnormali, la pseudoscienza nell'attività subacquea, Captain Nemo Edizioni, 2015

References

Year of birth missing (living people)
Living people
Italian expatriates in Egypt
Italian underwater divers
Divers from Rome